Subhadra Sen Gupta (June 1952 – 3 May 2021) was an Indian writer. She was the winner of Sahitya Akademi's 2015 Bal Sahitya Puraskar and wrote over 30 books. Her book, Mystery of the House of Pigeons, was adapted into a television series for Doordarshan as Khoj Khazana Khojher. Most of her books are in the genres of historical fiction and non-fiction, but she also wrote travelogues, comic strips and detective and ghost stories.

Life and career
Sen Gupta was born in Delhi. She held a master's degree in history. She began writing in college, working as a copywriter for advertising agencies.

Some of her works include Goodbye, Pasha Begum! from The Puffin Book of Spooky Ghost Stories (a horror story where a girl holidaying in Delhi finds herself as a slave in the Mughal era), Bishnu - The Dhobi Singer (a dhobi boy who is taken under the tutelage of Tansen) and A Mauryan Adventure (the daughter of a soldier in Ashoka's army finds herself travelling the world). The Secret Diary of the World's Worst Cook (the child of two physicists who is bad at physics himself finds a diary written by a boy in a similar situation coming from a family of cooks) is part of a book series, World's Worst, written in the diary format. This series also includes The Secret Diary of the World's Worst Cook. A Flag, A Song And a Pinch of Salt features 19 freedom fighters of India and their inspiring stories.

She also wrote a book for TERI, Caring for Nature: Bapu and the Missing Blue Pencil. Her 2015 book, A Children's History of India, was about the history of India written for children over the age of 10 years. In 2020, she released The Constitution of India for Children (sourced from books written by Ramachandra Guha, Bipan Chandra, Granville Austin and Derek O'Brien) and Mahal: Power and Pageantry in the Mughal Harem (about the social life of a harem in the Mughal era). She is also famous for her books A Bagful of History, The Teenage Diary of Jodh Bai and The Teenage Diary of Jahanara

Sen Gupta died of COVID-19 on 3 May 2021, at the age of 68, amid the COVID-19 pandemic in India.

Awards and accolades
Her book, Mystery of the House of Pigeons, was adapted into a six-part television series by Feisal Alkazi as Khoj Khazana Khojher on Doordarshan. Her works were also chosen as part of NCERT textbooks. Three of her books, Twelve O'Clock Ghost Stories, The Teenage Diary of Jodh Bai and A Clown for Tenali Rama were included in the annual White Ravens catalogue at the Bologna Children's Book Fair. In 2015, she was awarded the Bal Sahitya Puraskar by the Sahitya Akademi for her contribution to children's literature in the English language.

Works

Stories
 Goodbye, Pasha Begum! (in The Book of Spooky Ghost Stories)
 Bishnu - The Dhobi Singer
 A Mauryan Adventured

Novels
 Danger in Darjeeling: Satyajit Ray's Feluda Mysteries (2010)
 A Flag, A Song And a Pinch of Salt
 Marching to Freedom
 The Secret Diary of the World's Worst Cook
 The Secret Diary of the World's Worst Friend
 Caring for Nature: Bapu and the Missing Blue Pencil
 A Children's History of India (2015)
 The Constitution of India for Children (2020)
 Mahal: Power and Pageantry in the Mughal Harem (2020)

References

1952 births
2021 deaths
English-language writers from India
Indian writers
21st-century Indian novelists
21st-century Indian essayists
Indian women essayists
Indian women novelists
21st-century Indian women writers
Writers from Delhi
Deaths from the COVID-19 pandemic in India